The Public Security Police is the main police service of Syria.

History

Police system
The person who manages the police is the Director General, whose superior is the Minister of the Interior through the Criminal Security Directorate. Special metropolitan police are in Damascus, Aleppo, and other major cities overseen directly by the Director General. 

Alongside with other Directorates, the Ministry of Interior controls the Internal Security Forces, through the Criminal Security Directorate, which are organised into at four separate divisions of police forces under a Director General: Administrative Police (Public Order Police), Traffic Police (whose official Day is on 4 May), Criminal Investigations, and Riot police, as well as a fanfare and the Khan al-Asal Police Academy. 

The internal security is partially separated from the police, the main internal security agencies are: Political Security Directorate and General Security Directorate.

Territorial organization 
At territorial level, the Syrian police is organized into Police Provincial Commands, each led by a major general, who is assisted by a brigadier general acting as a deputy. The Operations Department is directed by another Brigadier General.
Districts are headed by Directors ranking Colonel to Brigadier General, while Subdistricts are led by junior Officers. As of October 2021, the Commander of Damascus region is Major General Hassan Jumaa. Also, as of June 27, 2021 Brig. Gen. Dirar Dandel is the commander of Daraa Governorate.

Equipment, uniforms, personnel and training

Police Equipment
Syrian police equipment is an issue. According to The Telegraph, which cites WikiLeaks, the Syrian police was supplied with advanced radio communications equipment, including 500 hand-held VS3000 radios, by Finmeccanica as late as 2011.

According to pro-militant website Zaman al-Wasl, in 2014 the Ministry of Interior received two Russian MI-171SH helicopters.
Regular police units appear to be equipped with the AKM assault rifle and the Browning Hi-Power, Makarov PM and GSh-18 pistols.

Elite police units, such as Special Mission Forces, are equipped with AK-103 and AK-104 assault rifles.

Police uniforms 
Police uniforms vary according to the police branch which it is considered. Generally speaking, policemen assigned to security tasks wear the military olive green with garrison caps, but also camouflage.

Since 2009, the Government has decided to change traffic policemen's uniforms from military olive green to grey pants, a white shirt with yellow shoulder patches and black belt and shoes.

As of 2011, Anti-terrorism police wore dark blue uniforms.

Ceremonial uniforms consist in jackboots, white peaked cap and white tunic, with dark trousers with a red trim for infantry and motorcycle units, and white cavalry pants for mounted troopers.
or, its task are limited to the protection and enforcement of security.

The Internal Security Forces are part of the Ministry of Interior but makes uses of military ranks.

Police vehicles

Personnel 	
As for total manpower of the Syrian police, in 2011 reportedly were about 100,000 police plus reserves, while 2016 estimates put the total force of 28,000 personnel, and 8,000 to 9,000 injured soldiers. Syrian women are allowed to serve (although not in frontline units) and to reach senior positions.

Operating methods 
The police reportedly undergo military-type and counter-terrorism training. Community policing is also a large element within the country of Syria. Citizens in Syria began using cyber community policing tactics via social media as a way to address the conflict happening around them. Doing so has given them some power to influence change in their environment. Their efforts demonstrate that global cyber community policing programs have the ability to connect communities and create social media networks that can effectively and proactively address, and hopefully prevent, threats to its citizens.

Training 
The police reportedly undergo military-type and counter-terrorism training, having a school in al-Hasakah.
Education for all police personnel is provided at three institutes: two central Police Training Schools in Damascus and Aleppo - Khan al-Asal Police Academy and the Officers College in Homs, where junior officers are sent for six-month courses in specialized areas of expertise.

Criminal Security Directorate 
Within the Criminal Security Directorate there are five Divisions and branches:
 The Administrative Police is also known as Public Order Police: they are responsible for general security and deal with non-emergency situations.
 The Emergency Division deals with emergency situations, operating roving patrols. The emergency number is 112.
 Traffic Police (emergency number is 115)
 Criminal Security Department;
 Riot Division;
 Electronic Criminal Branch, in charge of combating computer- and web-based crime. According to pro-government newspaper Al-Watan, the Electronic Criminal Branch has a dedicated criminal laboratory.
At the central level, the Directorate is the body in charge for relations with INTERPOL, of which the country has been a member since 1953.  

As of October 2021, Syria was readmitted to INTERPOL’s global police communications network after being subjected to restrictive measures since 2011, thereby allowing Damascus to access databases, communicate with the other 194 members, and issue international arrest warrants, called "red notices".  

Also has an its own Commission for combating money laundering in cooperation with the Commission of the same name at the Central Bank of Syria.

Since 8 July 2019, the head of the Criminal Security Directorate is General Nasser Deeb, former head of the Hama branch of the Political Security Directorate and former assistant director of the Damascus branch.

Criminal Security Department 
The Criminal Security Department is the subdivision of the Criminal Security Directorate which is in charge for general investigative police duties. Police records in Syria are maintained by the Ministry of Interior, Criminal Security Department and separate records are maintained by each jurisdiction: some jurisdictions are computerized, but there is no central computerized database.

Within the Criminal Security there is a subdivision known as the "Department of Protection of Public Moralities", tasked with investigating suspect homosexuals and their activities.

As of 2021, the director of the Criminal Security Department is General Hussein Jomaa.

Riot police 
The Riot police ( Qiwa Hafz al-Nizam) is part of the Criminal Security Directorate. 

The riot police core missions are to provide tactical security, crowd control and riot control for demonstrations. In Damascus, the riot police is also used in order to protect diplomatic missions against protestors. 

Riot Police is organized into Battalions and Brigades.
During the Syrian war, the riot police has been used in order to break early protests; according to pro-opposition opinionists, it even opened fire on demonstrators.

Syrian riot police is issued typical riot equipment, such as riot helmets, tonfa, rubber batons, shields, body armor, bulletproof vests, rubber bullets and plastic bullets. 

Other heavier equipment includes armoured personnel carriers, water cannons, tear gas and pepper spray. The riot police is also reportedly equipped with armoured vehicles.

Policemen assigned to security and riot control duty wear the military olive green with garrison caps, but also camouflage.

Anti-Narcotics Directorate 
The Anti-Narcotics Directorate, independent from the Criminal Security Directorate since 1996, has responsibility for anti-drug law enforcement and intelligence gathering. 

The anti-narcotics establishment was separated from the police in 2002 and made an independent Directorate within the Ministry of Interior. Before the outbreak of the Syrian War, the Government also operated regional counternarcotics offices in Aleppo province and in Homs province, with plans to open offices in the remaining provinces.

The work of the Anti-Narcotics Directorate is specialised in guiding and coordinating efforts aimed at fighting the illicit traffic, plantation and use of drugs, plans the fight against drugs in coordination with other authorities, executes international anti-drugs operations, and collects information on drug crimes.

As of 2006, the Anti-Narcotics Directorate was subdivided into:
 Internal anti-drug division;
 International anti-drug division;
 Information division;
 Rehabilitation and training division.

Specialist organizations 
Aside of the general police, there are also other specialized organizations, such as the Gendarmerie for control in rural areas and the Desert Guard for border control (especially the Syrian-Iraqi border), up to 10,000-men strong. These latter two organizations have a military character.

For ceremonial duties, the Internal Security Forces also have a cavalry battalion based in Damascus.
Other element of the internal security, albeit separated by the Internal Security Forces and by the Ministry of the Interior, is the Military Police.

Syrian Special Mission Forces

See also
 Ministry of Interior (Syria)
Law enforcement in Syria
Judiciary of Syria
List of equipment of the Syrian Army

References

External links
 https://reliefweb.int/sites/reliefweb.int/files/resources/c-acaps-syria-country-profile-09.03.2016.pdf

Law enforcement in Syria
Law of Syria